Liechtenstein first participated in the Olympic Games in 1936, and has sent athletes to compete in most Summer Olympic Games and Winter Olympic Games since then. The Liechtenstein Olympic Committee was created in 1935.

Liechtenstein is the smallest country in the world by population and the second smallest by area (after Bermuda, but smallest sovereign state) to have won an Olympic gold medal, although San Marino is the smallest country to have won any medal.  Athletes from Liechtenstein have won a total of ten medals, all in alpine skiing. It is the only country to have won medals at the Winter, but not Summer Olympic Games. Liechtenstein has the most medals per capita of any country, with nearly one medal for every 3,600 inhabitants. Seven of its ten medals have been won by members of the same family: siblings Hanni and Andreas Wenzel, and Hanni's daughter Tina Weirather. Further, the brothers Willi and Paul Frommelt have won two of the other three; only Ursula Konzett has medaled for her country without being related to Wenzels or Frommelts.

Xaver Frick, a founding member of the country's national olympic committee, is the only Liechtenstein athlete to have competed in both the summer and winter Olympic games.

Medal tables

Medals by Summer Games

Medals by Winter Games

Medals by winter sport

List of medalists

See also
 List of flag bearers for Liechtenstein at the Olympics
 :Category:Olympic competitors for Liechtenstein
 Liechtenstein at the Paralympics

References

External links
 
 
 

 
Olympics